Edward Fitton  may refer to:

Edward Fitton (the elder) (1527–1579), English MP for Cheshire
Edward Fitton (the younger) (c. 1548–1606), English MP for Wigan
Sir Edward Fitton, 1st Baronet (1572–1619), of the Fitton baronets
Sir Edward Fitton, 2nd Baronet (1603–1643), of the Fitton baronets

See also
Fitton (disambiguation)